The Forrest railway line is a former branch railway in Victoria, Australia. It branched off the Warrnambool railway line at Birregurra, and ran through the foothills of the Otway Ranges to the town of Forrest.

It opened to Deans Marsh on 19 December 1889, and to Forrest on 5 June 1891. It had eight stations at opening: Whoorel, Deans Marsh, Arlett's Corner, Murroon, Dewing's Creek, Gerangamete, Barwon Downs, and Yaugher. On 21 September 1891, four stations were renamed: Arlett's Corner became Pennyroyal, Dewing's Creek became Barwon Downs, Barwon Downs became Yaugher, and Yaugher became Forrest. In the 1940 timetable, trains stopped at the same eight stations as in September 1891, with the train taking fifty minutes to get from Forrest to Birregurra. The line closed in March 1957.

The Forrest railway was a key means of transport for the Otway Ranges timber and coal industries. Prior to the opening of the Great Ocean Road, the Forrest railway, with connecting coaches at Deans Marsh, was also the primary means of reaching the coastal resort town of Lorne.

An extension of the line from Forrest to Barramunga was discussed from the 1890s until at least the 1910s. In 1904, it initially received the support of the Parliamentary Standing Committee on Railways but, following an unfavourable report from an officer of the Railways Department, it did not proceed. Local campaigns for the extension continued for several years thereafter, but were unsuccessful.

The Birregurra-Forrest "Tiger" Rail Trail is a walking and cycling track which follows a section of the alignment of the former Forrest line.

Line guide

References

Closed regional railway lines in Victoria (Australia)
Transport in Barwon South West (region)